

This is a list of the National Register of Historic Places listings in Cleveland, Ohio.

This is intended to be a complete list of the properties and districts on the National Register of Historic Places in Cleveland, Ohio, United States. Latitude and longitude coordinates are provided for many National Register properties and districts; these locations may be seen together in an online map.

There are 424 properties and districts listed on the National Register in Cuyahoga County, including 4 National Historic Landmarks. The city of Cleveland is the location of 268 of these properties and districts, including 3 of the National Historic Landmarks; they are listed here, while the remainder are listed separately. Four properties and districts are split between Cleveland and other parts of the county, and are thus included on both lists. Another 8 properties in Cleveland were once listed but have been removed.

Current listings

|}

Former listings

|}

See also
 List of National Historic Landmarks in Ohio
 National Register of Historic Places listings in Ohio

References

External links

Cleveland Landmarks, as designated by the Cleveland Landmarks Commission

History of Cleveland
Cleveland-related lists